The Alice Micropolitan Statistical Area is in Jim Wells County, Texas. It principal city is Alice, 44 miles from Corpus Christi, Texas, the closest Metropolitan Statistical Area. The closest Micropolitan Statistical Area is 39 miles in Beeville.

Population Over 10,000
 Alice, Texas (Principal City)

Population Between 5,000 and 10,000
 San Diego, Texas (partial)

Populations Between 1,000 and 5,000
 Orange Grove, Texas
 Premont, Texas
 Rancho Alegre, Texas

Population Under 1,000
 Alfred-South La Paloma, Texas
 Alice Acres, Texas
 Coyote Acres, Texas
 K-Bar Ranch, Texas
 Loma Linda East, Texas
 Owl Ranch-Amargosa, Texas
 Pernitas Point, Texas (mostly)
 Sandia, Texas
 Westdale, Texas

Unincorporated communities
 Alfred, Texas
 Ben Bolt, Texas
 Bentonville, Texas
 Casa Blanca, Texas
 La Gloria, Texas
 Palito Blanco, Texas
 Rancho de la Parita, Texas
 Springfield, Texas

External links
United States Census Bureau
U.S. population estimates

Micropolitan areas of Texas